Sami Lähteenmäki (born 19 September 1989) is a Finnish ice hockey player currently playing for Lukko of the Finnish Liiga.

Lähteenmäki made his SM-liiga debut playing with HPK during the 2007–08 SM-liiga season.

Career statistics

References

External links

1989 births
Living people
People from Loppi
Ässät players
Finnish ice hockey right wingers
HPK players
Lempäälän Kisa players
Lukko players
SaPKo players
Sportspeople from Kanta-Häme
TuTo players